Adaina ipomoeae is a moth of the family Pterophoridae. It is found in Cuba, Jamaica, Puerto Rico, Guadeloupe, the Dominican Republic, Grenada, and Florida.

Description
The forewings are pale ochreous and the markings are dark brown. The hindwings and fringes are pale ochreous. Adults are on wing in January, August and October.

The larvae feed on Ipomoea tiliacea and Merremia umbellata.

References

Moths described in 2009
Moths of North America
Oidaematophorini